All Hell Breaks Loose is the sixth studio album by German thrash metal band Destruction, released on 25 April, 2000 by Nuclear Blast. It was the first official album released since Cracked Brain in 1990, and the first with Schmier returning to vocals and bass since Release from Agony in 1988. It also marks the return of the band to a three-piece lineup.

The album includes a cover of Metallica song "Whiplash".

Content 
Although All Hell Breaks Loose is considered to be a return to thrash metal roots for Destruction, it still retains some of the groove metal influences from the band's 1990s releases from their "Neo-Destruction" period.

Track listing 

Note
 "Whiplash" is a hidden bonus track on some copies of the record.

Personnel 
Writing, performance and production credits are adapted from the album's liner notes.

Destruction
 Schmier – bass, vocals
 Mike Sifringer – guitars
 Sven Vormann – drums

Guest musicians
 Peter Tägtgren – guitars, vocals on "Total Desaster 2000"

Production
 Peter Tägtgren – production, recording
 Destruction – production, recording

Artwork and design
 Joachim Luetke – cover artwork
 Dirk Gohr – layout
 Axel Jusseit – photography

Charts

References

External links 
 
 All Hell Breaks Loose at Nuclear Blast

Destruction (band) albums
2000 albums
Nuclear Blast albums
Albums produced by Peter Tägtgren